Gerakies is a village in the Nicosia District of Cyprus, located  west of Moutoullas.

References

Communities in Nicosia District